The 2020 Indy Eleven season is the club's seventh season of existence, their seventh consecutive season in the second tier of American soccer, and their third season in the league now named the USL Championship. This article covers the period from November 18, 2019, the day after the 2019 USL-C Playoff Final, to the conclusion of the 2020 USL-C Playoff Final, scheduled for November 12–16, 2020.

Roster

Competitive

USL Championship

Standings — Group E

Match results

U.S. Open Cup 

As a USL Championship club, Indy will enter the competition in the Second Round, to be played April 7–9.

References

Indy Eleven seasons
Indy Eleven
Indy Eleven
Indy Eleven